Vivimi (English: Live through me) is the second single released in February 2005 from Italian singer Laura Pausini's sixth Italian album Resta in ascolto. "Víveme" is the Spanish-language version adapted by Pausini and Badia which was featured as the theme song in the Mexican telenovela La Madrastra.

It was the second time that Biagio Antonacci wrote a song for Laura Pausini after the smash hit "Tra te e il mare" in 2000.

The song was re-recorded in 2013 as a duet with Spanish singer Alejandro Sanz for Pausini's compilation album 20 – The Greatest Hits. The Spanish-language duet was released as a single in December 2013.

Cover versions
 Mexican singer Daniela Romo included a cover of the Spanish-language version of the song in her album Sueños de Cabaret, released in 2008.
 Chinese actress-singer Yuan Quan covered the Chinese version of the song, titled The Poems that I've Read, in her album The Lonely Flower in 2007.

Track listing
 CD-single
 "Vivimi"
 "Vivimi" (Instrumental)

Charts

Peak positions
Original version

2013 version (feat. Alejandro Sanz)

Year-end charts

References

Laura Pausini songs
Pop ballads
2004 songs
2005 singles
2013 singles
Alejandro Sanz songs
Telenovela theme songs
Songs written by Biagio Antonacci
Warner Records singles
Music videos shot in Venice